70th Infantry Division may refer to:

70th Infantry Division (United Kingdom)
70th Infantry Division (United States)
70th Infantry Division (Wehrmacht)